Angelo Alessio (born 29 April 1965 in Capaccio) is an Italian football manager and former player.

Playing career
A central midfielder, Alessio started his professional career with then-Serie A club Avellino in 1984. He was then signed by Italian powerhouse Juventus in 1987, with whom he played until 1992 (except for a season loan at Bologna in 1988–89), winning a Coppa Italia–UEFA Cup double in 1990. He then moved to Serie A club Bari, before to join Cosenza in the Serie B and then returning to Avellino (now in Serie C1) in 1997. He ended his career in 1998 after a season with Modena.

Coaching career
After retirement, Alessio joined Napoli as a coaching staff member, first in charge of the youth teams and subsequently as a first team assistant. He then served as head coach for a number of Serie C2 teams (Imolese, Massese, SPAL); however it was not until his combination with Antonio Conte at Siena where his talents were truly noticed.

After achieving promotion out of the Serie B under Conte with Siena, the pair accepted the job at Juventus. At Juventus, Alessio enjoyed three consecutive years of Serie A domination, with three league titles and two Italian Super Cups. After three years at Juventus, in which he once managed as caretaker from October 2012 to December 2012, he again joined Conte at the Italy national football team. After a somewhat successful term and Italy's exit out of the Euros, Alessio parted with Italy and again to followed Conte to Chelsea. In January 2019 he confirmed his intention to start a career of his own as a head coach, thus effectively ending his long-time collaboration with Conte.

On 16 June 2019, Alessio was named manager of Scottish Premiership club Kilmarnock. In his first matches in charge, Kilmarnock lost in Europa League qualification to Welsh Premier League club Connah's Quay Nomads. Alessio was sacked by Kilmarnock in December 2019, with the team sitting in fifth place.

On 10 June 2021, Alessio was named head coach of Liga 1 club Persija Jakarta.

Style of play
A versatile player, Alessio was known for his willingness to play not only anywhere in midfield, but also in almost any position across the entire pitch. Usually deployed as a central midfielder, he was also frequently played as a second striker during his time with Avellino.

Managerial statistics

Honours
Avellino
Torneo Estivo del 1986: 1986

Juventus
Coppa Italia: 1989–90
UEFA Cup: 1989–90

References

1965 births
Living people
Italian footballers
U.S. Avellino 1912 players
Juventus F.C. players
Bologna F.C. 1909 players
S.S.C. Bari players
Cosenza Calcio 1914 players
Modena F.C. players
Serie A players
Serie B players
Serie C players
Italian football managers
UEFA Cup winning players
Association football midfielders
Chelsea F.C. non-playing staff
S.P.A.L. managers
Kilmarnock F.C. managers
Persija Jakarta managers
Expatriate football managers in Indonesia
Scottish Professional Football League managers
Italian expatriate football managers
Expatriate football managers in Scotland